Perry Thomas is an American football coach.  He is the head football coach at Campbellsville University, a position he has held since the 2008 season.

Coaching career
In 2010, Thomas's team finished the regular season with a record of 7–4.  They went to the Victory Bowl, losing to North Greenville by a score of 42–16.

Head coaching record

College

References

External links
 Campbellsville profile

Year of birth missing (living people)
Living people
Campbellsville Tigers football coaches
High school football coaches in Kentucky
African-American coaches of American football
20th-century African-American sportspeople
21st-century African-American sportspeople